The national emblem of Papua New Guinea consists of a bird-of-paradise over a traditional spear and a kundu drum. Designed by Hal Holman, an Australian artist working for the Papuan government, Holman was also involved in the design of the National flag. Both the emblem and the flag was accepted by the House of Assembly of Papua and New Guinea and signed into law as the National Identity Ordinance by the Administrator Sir Leslie Johnson on 24 June 1971. The ordinance came into effect after its publication in the Papua New Guinea Gazette of 1 July 1971.

Description

History

See also

Papua New Guinea
History of Papua New Guinea
Flag of Papua New Guinea
Coats of arms of Oceania
Hal Holman
Wilhelm Solf

References

Papua New Guinea
National symbols of Papua New Guinea
Papua New Guinea
Papua New Guinea
Papua New Guinea
Papua New Guinea
Papua Niugini